Nand Lal Meena may refer to:
Nand Lal Meena (born 1936), Indian politician from Baran district, Rajasthan
Nand Lal Meena (born 1946), Indian politician, former cabinet minister in the Government of Rajashtan